Kakhaberi Sartania (born 8 August 1967) is a professional Georgian footballer.

Career
He began his football career in 1985 in the amateur Odishi 1919. In 1988 he moved to the Russian "Tempo" (Shuya), but the following year he returned to Odishi 1919. In 1990, together with the team from Zugdidi, he took part in the first draw of the Georgian championship. He played for the team for three seasons, during which time he played 59 matches (8 goals) in the elite of Georgian football.

In the autumn of 1993 he moved to Ukraine, where he became a player of the amateur club Stroitel (Brovary). In the spring of 1994 he moved to  Desna Chernihiv, the main club of the city of Chernihiv, where he made his debut on March 27, 1994, in a draw (0: 0) home match of the 21st round of the Ukrainian First League against Naftovyk Okhtyrka. Sartania came on the field in the starting lineup and played the entire match. He scored his debut goal for Desna Chernihiv on September 1, 1994, in the 44th minute (from the penalty spot) of the winning (2: 1) home match of the 1/64 final of the Ukrainian Cup against Sumy. Sartania came on the field in the starting lineup and played the entire match. In the spring and summer of 1994 he played 17 matches in the First League of Ukraine and 1 (1 goal) - in the Ukrainian Cup. In September 1994 he moved to Vorskla. He made his debut in the T-shirt of the Poltava club on September 10, 1994, in a draw (0: 0) away match of the 7th round of the First League against Dynamo Kyiv. Cahaberi came on the field in the starting lineup and played the entire match. By the end of the 1994–95 season, he had played 19 matches in the First League.

In the summer of 1995 he returned to Desna Chernihiv. He made his debut the club of Chernihiv on September 6, 1995, in the victorious (6: 1) home match of the 9th round of Group A of the Ukrainian Second League against Kakhovka. Sartania came on the field in the starting lineup and played the entire match. He scored his debut goal for Desna after his return on October 26, 1997, in the 75th minute of the lost (3: 5) away match of the 1/16 finals of the Ukrainian Cup against Metallurg Mariupol. Kahaberi took the field in the 46th minute, replacing Yaroslav Zaiats. He scored his debut goal in the First League of Ukraine on June 11, 1998, in the 90th minute of the draw (2: 2) away match of the 40th round against Alexandria's "Poligraftekhnika". Sartania came on in the 75th minute, replacing Valeriy Shapovalov. He played in the team until the fall of 1999, during which time he played 112 matches (2 goals) and 9 matches (1 goal) in the Ukrainian Cup. In the 1995–96 season, he played on loan for Roma's Electron in the Ukrainian Amateur Championship (5 matches, 1 goal). In the 1997–98 season he played for the Chernihiv Farm Club, Slavutych-ChNPP (2 matches in the Second League).

In 2000 he became a player of "Nizhyn". He played 14 matches in the amateur championship of Ukraine, after which he ended his football career.

Honours
Nizhyn
 Chernihiv Oblast Football Championship: 2000
 Chernihiv Oblast Football Cup: 2000

Desna Chernihiv
 Ukrainian Second League: 1996–97

References

External links
Kakhaberi Sartania Footballfacts.ru

1967 births
Living people
Footballers from Georgia (country)
Expatriate footballers from Georgia (country)
Erovnuli Liga players
FC Desna Chernihiv players
FC Elektron Romny players
FC Slavutych players
Expatriate footballers in Ukraine
Expatriate sportspeople from Georgia (country) in Ukraine
Association football midfielders
Ukrainian Premier League players
Ukrainian First League players